Beaver Dam is an unincorporated community and census-designated place (CDP) in Mohave County, Arizona, United States, that is located in the Arizona Strip region and was settled in 1863. It is located in the 86432 ZIP Code. It had a population of 1,552 as of the 2020 census, down from 1,962 at the 2010 census.

Beaver Dam and the neighboring communities of Littlefield, Scenic and Desert Springs have the distinction of being the only towns in Arizona along I-15. Owing to their location in the Arizona Strip, northwest of the Grand Canyon and west of the Virgin River, they are isolated by hundreds of miles from the rest of the state. Absent by plane or helicopter, travel to other towns within Arizona requires crossing through either Nevada or Utah, or routing through unpaved roads to the rest of Arizona's road network.

The great Western author and essayist Wallace Stegner reputedly said of the Arizona Strip that "it is connected geographically to Utah, politically to Arizona and neither one gives a damn."

History

The site of Beaver Dam was located along the pack horse route of the Old Spanish Trail from 1828 and the later wagon route of the Mormon Road between Salt Lake City and Los Angeles from 1847. Beaver Dam Wash and subsequently the town were named for a beaver dam that occupied and held back the waters on the wash when the first Mormon party under Jefferson Hunt established the wagon road through the area in 1847.

The Mormon Road was used by Forty-niners in 1849 and Mormon colonists and other travelers from then on. Both routes passed southward from the Beaver Dam Mountains to the Virgin River along the Beaver Dam Wash to where it met the river. From 1855, the road was a major wagon freighting road until the railroad arrived in Nevada in 1905. Beaver Dam was first settled by Mormon colonists in 1863.

Contemporary Beaver Dam

Beaver Dam is home to the three schools that make up the Littlefield Unified School District; Beaver Dam Elementary and Beaver Dam Jr./Sr. High School.

Beaver Dam and neighboring Littlefield have the distinction of being the only towns in Arizona along I-15. Owing to its location northwest of  Grand Canyon National Park and west of the Virgin River, Beaver Dam is essentially isolated from the rest of the state. Travel to other towns within Arizona requires crossing through either Nevada or Utah, or by traversing unpaved roads to Arizona State Route 389 (which is paved) — and even at that, is connected only to the rest of the Arizona Strip (the part of Arizona separated from the rest of the state by the Grand Canyon), not to Arizona at large.

The Virgin River Gorge is located just to the east of Beaver Dam.

A post office is located in Beaver Dam on McKnight Boulevard. Fire Station No. 1 is located in Beaver Dam (No. 2 is located in Desert Springs, and No. 3 is located in Scenic). Beaver Dam has a large population of "snowbirds" (retirees from colder latitudes seeking temperate winter temperatures) during the winter months.

Demographics

Beaver Dam first appeared on the 1930 U.S. Census as District 30 of Mohave County (AKA Beaver Dam). It had 58 residents and was majority White population. With the combination of all 35 county districts into 3 in 1940, it did not formally appear again until 2010, when it was made a census-designated place (CDP).

The city is made up of 74.2 percent White, 22.6 percent Hispanic, 0 percent Black.

Onscreen
Beaver Dam has been featured as a filming location for a few movies and television shows.

In films 
 Scenes from the 1988 movie On Our Own were filmed at the Beaver Dam Station in downtown.
 Scenes from the 2002 movie Crazy Horse were also filmed at the Beaver Dam Station.
 Scenes from the 1996 movie Navajo Blues were filmed around the Beaver Dam area.

In television 
 Unsolved Mysteries filmed a segment of their program in 1995 on Old Highway 91, between Beaver Dam and Mesquite (Season 8, episode 16).
 Local news stations from Las Vegas, Salt Lake City, and national news stations The Weather Channel and CNN have filed reports from Beaver Dam. Most of the reports were about the Beaver Dam Wash flooding and destroying homes and properties, but there have also been police chases, shootings and a fugitive man hunt making national headlines.

See also

 List of census-designated places in Arizona
 Littlefield Unified School District
 The Church of Jesus Christ of Latter-day Saints in Arizona

References

External links

 Littlefield Unified School District No. 9

Census-designated places in Mohave County, Arizona
Populated places established in 1864
Census-designated places in Arizona
Mormon Road